The Tangale people are one of the ethnic groups in Northern Nigeria, situated in Gombe State. The Tangale people that majorly speak Tangale got their name from “Tangal”, a chief of Billiri, in the present day Gombe state of Nigeria. It is believed that Tangal was instrumental in organizing the clans under his leadership and because of this, the people under him were referred to as the Tangale (as it was customary in many African communities to name a land or ethnic group after their leader).

History of settlement 
The Tangale people are migrants from Yemen through Egypt and then to the present Borno State. However, due to constant inter-tribal conflicts, they had to keep migrating from one place to another. Eventually, they settled in at least seven different locations before they came to their presently known settlement, Kaltungo. A list of some of those places they settled at include; SanumKude (also known as Big San) near Ngazargamu and Kupto. Kupto was like the Biblical ‘Corinth’; a place where different tribes and groups came together to co-exist and co-habit. At Kupto, the Tangale’s lived together with the Lunguda, Kare-Kare, Tera, Waja, Bolewa, Songom and other neighbouring tribes. It was from Kupto that they further migrated to find new shelter; mostly mountainous areas which most felt were safer from the frequent raids and attacks they encountered from marauders.

Culture 
Adult males were supposed to show their manhood by fighting, and as proof of their courage, they were required to bring the heads of the enemy they had murdered with them upon returning from the battleground. These combat trophies were given to a priest, who placed them under the family's holy tree.

Mai Tangale 
The current Mai Tangale is Malam Danladi Sanusi-Maiyamba

Languages 
The native language of Tangale Tribe is Tangale but due to the dominance of Hausa language in the Northern Nigeria, most of them can also speak Hausa fluently.

Food 
The Tangale people food are ar bayo", prepared with a special type of daddawa (beanscake);  "ed mammu";  "kwaksak" and "Shinga"

Religions 
The Tangale people were mostly idol/ Spirit worshipers before the advent of colonial rule. They have spirits like Nanamudo (Mother of Death), Yamba (the goddess of creation). Present day Tangale people have desert their traditional idol worship with Christians as the majority in Tangale land and a small percentage of Muslims.

Festivals 

 Pissi Tangale festival
 ‘Bai’ Carnival/ Palam Tangle(Dog festival)

 Eku festival
 Wula
 Pe Kodok
 Pand Kungo

References

Ethnic groups in Nigeria
Gombe State